“Marge and Homer Turn a Couple Play” is the twenty-second and the final episode of the seventeenth season of the American animated television series The Simpsons. It originally aired on the Fox network in the United States on May 21, 2006.

Plot
The Springfield Isotopes win first place in the NL West thanks to their new acquisition of Buck “Home run King” Mitchell. During a game at Springfield Stadium, Buck's pop star wife Tabitha Vixx sings the first few bars of the American national anthem, then strips down to lingerie and launches into a lascivious performance of one of her own songs. Buck, humiliated, delivers a terrible performance at that night's game, and even accidentally lets go of the bat while swinging it which accidentally hits Sideshow Mel's fiancé, causing the crowd to boo at him. He later sees Homer and Marge kissing on the Jumbo-Vision.

Later that night, Buck shows up at the Simpsons’ front door and asks for help with his marriage in exchange for season tickets. Marge doubts their ability to counsel other couples. Her doubts lead to her and Homer flirting, which Buck sees as an example of what he wants with his own wife. At the first session—taking place in the Simpsons’ living room—Buck confesses he assumed Tabitha would give up her recording career to focus on his minor league baseball career, to which she responds she will not stay in a mismatched marriage. The next session takes place at Buck and Tabitha's mansion and goes much more smoothly. As a result of his now-steady personal life, Buck's game returns to superior form.

Tabitha continues her concert tour, and Homer comes to check up on her in her dressing room. There, he gives her a neck rub; her loud moans and Homer's praise of the fried chicken he is eating are overheard through the door by Buck, who misinterprets them and barges in enraged and slugs Homer. Now, with his marriage again on the rocks, Buck goes into another slump. Homer wants to get them back together, but Marge refuses to help. A few minutes later, Tabitha knocks on the door; she tells a shocked Marge that she plans to leave Buck for good. Marge objects, insisting they stay together.

During Buck's next game, Homer hijacks the Duff blimp and spells out a message to Buck, supposedly from Tabitha, proclaiming her love. Buck, reinvigorated, hits the ball into the blimp itself, causing it to deflate and crash onto the field; as Homer alone runs from the wreckage, Buck realizes Tabitha had no part in the message. He charges Homer, bat in hand, but Marge dissuades him by saying that Homer was just trying to help, and that marriage is hard work but worth it. Tabitha then comes on the Jumbo-Vision to tell Buck she wants to stay together.

The episode closes with another Isotope player, Tito, saying he does not care about the healed marriage because bandits just kidnapped his mother.

Reception 
Sociologist Tim Delaney wrote that the episode illustrates the bandwagon effect: interest by fairweather fans drives further popularity of the Isotopes as they win, and they lose their popularity during slumps.  Physicist Simon Singh wrote that the episode's throwaway use of Mersenne primes and other mathematical concepts is an example of Simpsons writers, many of whom have a strong math background, adding bonus math jokes tofr others who can recognize them.

References

External links
 

The Simpsons (season 17) episodes
2006 American television episodes
Baseball animation